Todd Everett Ritchie (born November 7, 1971) is a former Major League Baseball pitcher who played in the major leagues from -.

Ritchie was drafted by the Minnesota Twins in the 1st round (12th overall) of the 1990 Major League Baseball draft and made his major league debut on April 3, 1997.

On October 3, the Twins released him, and he signed with the Pittsburgh Pirates on December 22. The Pirates won the game in the bottom of the ninth as Aramis Ramírez singled in Brian Giles with the winning run. 

After the 2001 season, on December 13, Ritchie was traded to the Chicago White Sox along with Lee Evans for Kip Wells, Sean Lowe, and Josh Fogg. He struggled in  though, losing 15 games with a 6.06 ERA, and becoming a free agent after the season. On January 14, he signed with the Milwaukee Brewers, but missed nearly the entire season with an injury. Ritchie signed as a free agent with the Tampa Bay Devil Rays for 2004, but spent most of the season in the minors. He signed with the Pirates for the  season, but retired from baseball during spring training. Assigned to Single-A Modesto, Ritchie had a 3.18 ERA in 4 appearances before being promoted to Double-A Tulsa on June 25. In his one appearance for Tulsa, he gave up 8 earned runs in 5.2 innings and retired again.

Todd and his wife Kristi have six children named Karley (26), Kyndall (21), Kamdyn (19), Kallyn (17), Kannon (15), and Krayton(15)

External links

Minnesota Twins players
Pittsburgh Pirates players
Chicago White Sox players
Milwaukee Brewers players
Tampa Bay Devil Rays players
Baseball players from Virginia
Major League Baseball pitchers
1971 births
Living people
Sportspeople from Portsmouth, Virginia
People from Duncanville, Texas
Duncanville High School alumni
Salt Lake Buzz players
Nashville Sounds players
Charleston RiverDogs players
Durham Bulls players
Modesto Nuts players
Tulsa Drillers players
Nashville Xpress players
Elizabethton Twins players
Hardware City Rock Cats players
Kenosha Twins players
Montgomery Biscuits players
Visalia Oaks players